Francis is a town in on the western edge of Summit County, Utah, United States. It is part of the Salt Lake City, Utah Metropolitan Statistical Area. The population was 1,077 at the 2010 census.

Geography

Demographics

As of the census of 2000, there were 698 people, 217 households, and 187 families residing in the town. The population density was 390.2 people per square mile (/km2). There were 233 housing units at an average density of 130.3 per square mile (/km2). The racial makeup of the town was 97.42% White, 0.29% African American, 0.29% Native American, 1.29% from other races, and 0.72% from two or more races. Hispanic or Latino of any race were 1.86% of the population.

There were 217 households, out of which 47.9% had children under the age of 18 living with them, 75.1% were married couples living together, 10.1% had a female householder with no husband present, and 13.4% were non-families. 11.1% of all households were made up of individuals, and 5.5% had someone living alone who was 65 years of age or older. The average household size was 3.22, and the average family size was 3.46.

In the town, the population was spread out, with 33.0% under the age of 18, 8.5% from 18 to 24, 31.8% from 25 to 44, 18.6% from 45 to 64, and 8.2% who were 65 years of age or older. The median age was 31 years. For every 100 females, there were 96.6 males. For every 100 females aged 18 and over, there were 95.0 males.

The median income for a household in the town was $55,536, and the median income for a family was $59,464. Males had a median income of $39,375 versus $26,354 for females. The per capita income for the town was $18,097. About 3.6% of families and 5.6% of the population were below the poverty line, including 8.3% of those under age 18 and 6.5% of those aged 65 or over.

Education
It is in the South Summit School District.

See also

 List of cities and towns in Utah

References

External links

 

Towns in Summit County, Utah
Towns in Utah
Populated places established in 1869
Salt Lake City metropolitan area
1869 establishments in Utah Territory